The EMD GP59 is a 4-axle diesel locomotive model built by General Motors Electro-Motive Division between 1985 and 1989. Power was provided by a 12-cylinder EMD 710G3A diesel engine, which could produce . It featured a  fuel tank. 36 examples of this locomotive were built including three demonstrators. Norfolk Southern placed the only order for the GP59 and also acquired the three demonstrators which featured an aerodynamic cab.

By adding a full cowl body, a comfort cab, and an HEP generator, the GP59 became the EMD F59PH.

In 2011 Norfolk Southern began a program to upgrade their fleet of GP59s, the only GP59s operating anywhere.  The first one was not released until March 2013 as NS 4650 GP59E.  The GP59E features a new EM2000 microprocessor, an all-new electrical cabinet with SmartStart auto start/stop, rebuilt 12-710G3C-BC prime-mover with EMDEC EUI system, NS-designed split cooling, the NS Admiral cab with cab signals, LSL, and CCB26 electronic brake valve.  The GP59E is set up to operate with NS class RP-M4C road slugs.

In 2016, Norfolk Southern began a program to upgrade GP50 and GP59 units to GP59ECO's. These will be similar to the GP33ECO locomotives, but these units will be paid for by Norfolk Southern, not government funding. In June 2016, the first unit, 4662, was completed, rebuilt from GP50 7073.

Original owners

External links

 Sarberenyi, Robert. EMD GP60, GP60M, GP60B, and GP59 Original Owners
 AltoonaWorks.info NS GP59E Rebuilds

GP59
B-B locomotives
Diesel-electric locomotives of the United States
Railway locomotives introduced in 1985
Freight locomotives
Standard gauge locomotives of the United States